George Hyde Fallon (July 24, 1902 – March 21, 1980), a Democrat, was a U.S. Congressman who represented the 4th congressional district of Maryland from January 3, 1945, to January 3, 1971.

Growing up, Fallon attended public schools, Calvert Business College, and Johns Hopkins University.  He engaged in the advertising sign business and made his entry into politics by becoming chairman of the Democratic state central committee of Baltimore, Maryland, in 1938.

He was elected to the Baltimore City Council from the third council district, serving from May 1939 to December 1944 when he resigned to take office as a Congressman. In 1944, he won election as a Democrat to the Seventy-ninth the twelve succeeding congresses, serving from January 3, 1945, to January 3, 1971.  While in congress, Fallon was chairman of the Committee on Public Works from the 89th through 91st Congresses. Fallon was also one of the congressmen wounded during the 1954 United States Capitol shooting. Fallon did not sign the 1956 Southern Manifesto, and voted in favor of the Civil Rights Acts of 1957, 1960, 1964, and 1968, as well as the 24th Amendment to the U.S. Constitution and the Voting Rights Act of 1965.

Fallon was an unsuccessful candidate for renomination in 1970 to the Ninety-second Congress after being labeled by conservationists as one of the dirty dozen for his record as the twelfth most anti-environmental congressman at that time.  Fallon retired to Baltimore, where he died in 1980.  He is interred in Greenmount Cemetery.

He was also the primary sponsor of the Federal Aid Highway Act of 1956.

See also
 United States Congress members killed or wounded in office

References

https://en.wikipedia.org/wiki/Federal_Aid_Highway_Act_of_1956#:~:text=Historical%20background%20of%20the%20Interstate,primary%20sponsor%20of%20the%20bill.

|-

1902 births
1980 deaths
20th-century American politicians
American shooting survivors
Baltimore City Council members
Democratic Party members of the United States House of Representatives from Maryland
Johns Hopkins University alumni
Politicians from Baltimore